The Grès et sables piquetés (French for: "spotted sandstone and sand") is a geological formation in Haute Marne and Meuse Departments, France, that dates back to the Early Cretaceous. Dinosaur remains are among the fossils that have been recovered from the formation.

Vertebrate paleofauna
 Iguanodon bernissartensis

See also

 List of dinosaur-bearing rock formations

References

Lower Cretaceous Series of Europe
Barremian Stage